Peralta Villa is a neighborhood in Oakland in Alameda County, California. It lies at an elevation of 20 feet (6 m). It was formerly an unincorporated community.

References

Neighborhoods in Oakland, California